Jean Gontier (born 26 January 1942) is a Swiss fencer. He competed in the team épée event at the 1964 Summer Olympics.

References

1942 births
Living people
Swiss male fencers
Olympic fencers of Switzerland
Fencers at the 1964 Summer Olympics